Selenomonas ruminantium is a species of Selenomonas bacteria which are closely associated with ruminants, aiding in digestion of their food. It is predominantly observed in the rumen of these animals, and is strictly anaerobic.

Shape and classification 
The bacterium has a rod shaped structure.

Gram classification

16S rRNA gene identification 
Selenomonas ruminantium was originally placed with the Gram-positive Firmicutes phylum based on its 16S rRNA gene. It was believed to be correct until the flagellar basal test was performed.

Flagellar basal test 
The observation of flagella  under electron microscope revealed the presence of four rings, a typical sign of gram negative species. Observation of the flagellar basal structure confirms that S. ruminantium has an outer membrane, a characteristic of Gram-negative bacteria . Gram-positive outer membranes or mycomembranes were recently reported for the Gram-positive general Corynebacterium and Mycobacterium, but none of them have flagella.

Tuft flagella 
The tuft of flagella is seen arising from the concave of basal body of S.ruminantium. The movement is achieved by self rotation about the axis of the body by the rotational force exerted by the tuft at the centre. If the polar region to midpoint distance is considered as 50% the tuft is located at the midpoint represented as 50% of the organism.

Lateral flagella 
The bacteria also exhibits polar or lateral flagellar structures  depending upon the medium in which they are developed.

Polymorphism in flagellar structures 
Their flagella exhibits polymorphic properties depending upon the environment of the bacteria. Generally the flagellae protruding from all points are clustered around the midpoint. Flagellin is glycosylated.

pH effect on the structure of flagella 
The bacterial flagella's existence depends upon the pH. The rumen pH is about 5.5 to 7.

Mobility

Glucose effect 
The medium of development determines the motility of the bacteria. For Selenomonas ruminantium, glucose suppresses the flagellation.

Swimming 
The microbe swims by self rotation about the axis of the body unlike its nearest appropriate comparison Rhodobacter sphaeroides, which the microbe rotates in a direction perpendicular to the axis of the body. The average number of flagella per 20 cells is 6.The microbe swims with a speed of 16ɥm/s.

Hooks 
The shape and size of the hooks on the flagellae differ by the physiological conditions present, but the general structure is S shaped.

References

External links
Type strain of Selenomonas ruminantium at BacDive -  the Bacterial Diversity Metadatabase

Veillonellaceae
Bacteria described in 1889